Paramount Theater or Paramount Theatre may refer to:

Canada
 Scotiabank Theatre or Paramount Theatre, a chain of theatres owned by Cineplex Entertainment
 Scotiabank Theatre Toronto or Paramount Theatre Toronto

China 
Paramount (Shanghai) or Paramount Theatre, Shanghai, China

United Kingdom 
 Paramount Theatre, Manchester or OdeonTheatre

United States 
American Broadcasting-Paramount Theatres, an American cinema chain
Paramount Theatre (Casa Grande, Arizona), a National Register of Historic Places listing in Pinal County, Arizona
Paramount Theatre (Los Angeles), California
Paramount Theatre (Oakland, California)
Paramount Theatre (Denver), Colorado
Paramount Theatre Building (Palm Beach, Florida)
Paramount Theater (Atlanta), Georgia
Paramount Theatre (Aurora, Illinois)
Paramount Theatre (Anderson, Indiana)
Paramount Theatre (Cedar Rapids, Iowa)
Paramount Arts Center or Paramount Theater, Ashland, Kentucky
Paramount Theatre (Boston, Massachusetts)
Paramount Theater (Springfield, Massachusetts)
Paramount Theater (Austin, Minnesota)
Paramount Theater (St. Cloud, Minnesota)
Paramount Theater (Clarksdale, Mississippi), a Mississippi Landmark
Paramount Theatre (Asbury Park, New Jersey)
Paramount Theatre (Brooklyn), New York
Paramount Theatre (Middletown, New York)
Paramount Theatre (New York City)
Paramount Theatre at Madison Square Garden or the Theater at Madison Square Garden, New York City
Arlene Schnitzer Concert Hall or Paramount Theatre, Portland, Oregon
Paramount Theatre and Office Building, a National Register of Historic Places listing in Sullivan County, Tennessee
Paramount Theatre (Abilene, Texas)
Paramount Theater (Baton Rouge, Louisiana)
Paramount Theatre (Austin, Texas)
Paramount Theater (Rutland, Vermont)
Paramount Theater (Charlottesville, Virginia)
Paramount Theatre (Doswell, Virginia), former name of a theatre in the Kings Dominion amusement park
Paramount Theatre (Seattle), Washington

See also
The Paramount (disambiguation)

Lists of theatres